FlyOne is a privately owned, low-cost airline headquartered in Chișinău, Moldova. It was founded in 2015 and formally launched operations in 2016. It operates scheduled and charter flights from its base at Chișinău International Airport.

History 
The airline received its Air Operator Certificate in late March 2016, and operated its first scheduled passenger flights in June 2016 to Antalya, Heraklion, and Rhodes.

Criticism 
FlyOne regularly receives negative comments from customers who have had their flights cancelled at short notice, encountered blunt and unhelpful customer service and been refused refunds. These comments can be widely viewed on Facebook and Instagram and on a number of review sites, with common themes of poor communication, sudden cancellation and lack of reasons given.

Destinations 
FLYONE currently operates direct flights to the following destinations:

Fleet

As of November 2021, the FlyOne fleet includes the following aircraft:

References

External links

Official website

Airlines of Moldova
Airlines established in 2016
Moldovan brands
2016 establishments in Moldova
Low-cost carriers